Nuria Rábano Blanco (born 15 June 1999) is a Spanish professional footballer who plays as a left back for Liga F club FC Barcelona and the Spain women's national team.

Early life 
Rábano started her career at Atlético Arousana.

Club career

Deportivo la Coruña (2016–20) 
While at Deportivo la Coruña, Rábano was a starter in their undefeated 2018–19 Reto Iberdrola campaign that saw them get promoted to the Primera División for the first time in their history. In Depor's first Primera División season, Rábano helped the team reach 4th place before the league season was cut short due to the COVID-19 pandemic. She made the decision to leave Depor at the end of the season because she felt it was time to play a higher level of football.

Real Sociedad (2020–22) 
At the end of the 2019–20 season, Rábano departed Deportivo la Coruña to sign a two-year contract with Real Sociedad. In the 2021–22 season, Rábano was an essential piece of Real Sociedad's defense as they qualified for the UEFA Women's Champions League for the first time in their history.

FC Barcelona (2022–present) 
On 17 June 2022, FC Barcelona Femení announced the signing of Rábano on a two-year contract.

International career 
Rábano was called up to represent Spain at the 2017 UEFA Women's Under-19 Championship. In Spain's second group stage match against Germany, she suffered a sprain in the ligament of her right ankle and was ruled out for the remainder of the competition. Spain went on to win the competition against France to advance to the 2018 FIFA U-20 Women's World Cup. Rábano was included in the squad for that tournament as well, and was a substitute throughout the tournament as Spain finished as runners-up.

References

External links
 Nuria Rábano at FC Barcelona
 Nuria Rábano at Real Sociedad
 
 
 

1999 births
Living people
Women's association football defenders
Spanish women's footballers
Footballers from Santiago de Compostela
Deportivo de La Coruña (women) players
Real Sociedad (women) players
Primera División (women) players
Spain women's youth international footballers